Diego Hernández Barriuso (born 19 September 1995), commonly known as Barri, is a Spanish professional footballer who plays as a central midfielder for Prva HNL  club NK Osijek. Mainly a central midfielder, he can also play as a right back.

Club career
Barri was born in Salamanca, Castile and León, and represented CD Navega, UD Salamanca and AD Unión Adarve as a youth. He made his senior debut with RSD Alcalá's reserve team in the 2014–15 season, in the regional leagues.

On 18 June 2016, after a one-year stint at CD Los Yébenes San Bruno, Barri signed for Tercera División side CD Móstoles URJC. On 20 June 2017, he moved to Getafe CF, being assigned to the reserves also in the fourth division.

Barri made his first team – and La Liga – debut on 21 April 2018, coming on as a second-half substitute for Sergio Mora in a 1–0 away win against SD Eibar. On 28 August, he signed a two-year deal with Albacete Balompié in Segunda División.

On 5 September 2020, Barri signed a two-year deal at CD Badajoz in Segunda División B. The following 18 January, he was loaned to Celta de Vigo B in the same league.

Barri moved abroad for the first time in his career on 30 January 2022, leaving cash-strapped Badajoz for NK Osijek of the Croatian Football League on an 18-month deal.

Career statistics

Club

References

External links

1995 births
Living people
Sportspeople from Salamanca
Spanish footballers
Footballers from Castile and León
Association football defenders
Association football midfielders
La Liga players
Segunda División players
Segunda División B players
Primera Federación players
Tercera División players
Divisiones Regionales de Fútbol players
CD Móstoles URJC players
Getafe CF B players
Getafe CF footballers
Albacete Balompié players
CD Badajoz players
Celta de Vigo B players
Croatian Football League players
NK Osijek players
Spanish expatriate footballers
Expatriate footballers in Croatia
Spanish expatriate sportspeople in Croatia
21st-century Spanish people